Robert Wakeham Pilot  (October 9, 1898 – December 17, 1967) was a Canadian artist, who worked mainly in oil on canvas or on panel, and as an etcher and muralist. He is considered to be the last artist in Canada to paint Impressionistically with any authority or significance.

Career
Pilot was born on 9 October 1898, at St. John's, Newfoundland, to Edward Frederick Pilot and his wife Barbara (née Merchant). In 1910, his widowed mother married the artist, Maurice Cullen, moving into Cullen's home in Montreal. As a child, Pilot assisted Cullen in his studio, and the two would take sketching trips together. He later studied in Montreal with William Brymner, then, in March 1916, joined the army. He served as a gunner on trench mortars in the Canadian Expeditionary Force, Fifth Division Artillery, during World War I. From 1920 to 1922, he studied at the Académie Julian in Paris. In 1922, he exhibited at the Paris Salon. He was influenced by Impressionism after he visited the artists' colony at Concarneau.

On returning to Canada, he was elected an associate of the Royal Canadian Academy of Arts in 1925, serving as the Academy's president from 1952 to 1954. The subject he preferred to paint was the urban landscape, particularly that of Quebec. His first solo show was in 1927, at the Watson Art Galleries. He won the Jessie Dow Prize at the Art Association of Montreal in that year and in 1934.

He re-enlisted in 1941, during World War II, serving as a captain in The Black Watch, and was mentioned in dispatches while in Italy, which resulted in him being made a Member of the Order of the British Empire (MBE) in 1944. He was awarded the Queen Elizabeth II Coronation Medal in 1953.

Paintings by Pilot were presented to Winston Churchill and to Queen Elizabeth II and the Duke of Edinburgh. Others are in the collection of the National Gallery of Canada and the Musée national des beaux-arts du Québec.

Pilot died at Montreal General Hospital on 17 December 1967, and was survived by his wife Patricia (née Dawes) and son, Wakeham. A retrospective exhibition of his work was held at the Montreal Museum of Fine Arts in 1969.

References

Further reading

External links
 Klinkhoff gallery page (shows several of Pilot's works)

1898 births
1967 deaths
20th-century Canadian painters
Canadian male painters
Artists from Montreal
Members of the Royal Canadian Academy of Arts
Canadian landscape painters
Académie Julian alumni
Artists from Newfoundland and Labrador
Canadian Expeditionary Force
Canadian military personnel of World War I
Canadian military personnel of World War II
Canadian Members of the Order of the British Empire
Black Watch officers
People from St. John's, Newfoundland and Labrador
20th-century Canadian male artists